Snowshoe Lake is a lake in the Lake Huron drainage basin in Algonquin Provincial Park in Nipissing District, Ontario, Canada. The primary outflow is an unnamed creek to West Harry Lake, which flows via the Big East River, the Muskoka River and the Moon and Musquash rivers into Lake Huron.

See also
List of lakes in Ontario

References

Lakes of Nipissing District